The Marvelous Mrs. Maisel is an American period comedy-drama television series, created by Amy Sherman-Palladino, that premiered on March 17, 2017, on Amazon Prime Video. Set in the late 1950s and early 1960s, it stars Rachel Brosnahan as Miriam "Midge" Maisel, a New York housewife who discovers she has a knack for stand-up comedy and pursues a career in it. It also stars Alex Borstein, Michael Zegen, Marin Hinkle, Tony Shalhoub, Kevin Pollak, Caroline Aaron, Jane Lynch and Luke Kirby. The pilot episode received critical acclaim and the series was picked up by Amazon Studios. On February 17, 2022, Amazon renewed the series for a fifth and final season, which is set to premiere on April 14, 2023. 

The series has also received critical acclaim. It won the Golden Globe Award for Best Television Series – Musical or Comedy in 2017 and the Primetime Emmy Award for Outstanding Comedy Series in 2018, with Sherman-Palladino receiving the awards for Outstanding Directing and Outstanding Writing at the latter ceremony. Brosnahan won the Primetime Emmy Award for Outstanding Lead Actress in a Comedy Series in 2018 and two consecutive Golden Globe Awards for Best Actress – Television Series Musical or Comedy in 2018 and 2019. Borstein won the Primetime Emmy Award for Outstanding Supporting Actress in a Comedy Series twice consecutively, in 2018 and 2019; Shalhoub won Outstanding Supporting Actor in a Comedy Series in 2019; and Kirby won Outstanding Guest Actor in a Comedy Series for his role as real-life comedian Lenny Bruce.

Premise

In season one, set in 1958 New York City, Miriam "Midge" Maisel is a young Jewish-American housewife and mother, living on Manhattan's Upper West Side. Each week, Midge's husband, Joel, performs at The Gaslight Café. Midge considers it a shared hobby, unaware the untalented Joel wants to be a professional comic. After a particularly dismal performance, a dejected Joel leaves Midge for his secretary. Midge, upset and drunk, returns to the Gaslight in her nightgown and stumbles onstage. In a bawdy impromptu set, Midge vents her predicament to the audience, then is arrested for obscenity. In the police car, Midge meets comic Lenny Bruce, also arrested for using obscenity. Gaslight manager Susie Meyerson bails Midge out of jail, and Midge later bails out Lenny. Recognizing Midge's raw talent, Susie coaches her to be a stand-up comic.

In the second season, Midge hones her comic skills at the Gaslight. As Susie works to book paying gigs, Midge hides her new career from family. Susie and Midge hit the road for a short comedy tour. Touring is harder than expected and female comics are discriminated against by their male counterparts. Midge later runs afoul of Sophie Lennon, a famous Great Depression-era female comedian who performs as an uncouth housewife from Queens. Midge rejects Sophie's advice to develop a similar gimmicky persona to compete in the male-dominated field. When Midge ridicules Sophie's corny act during a Gaslight set, a vindictive Sophie has her blacklisted from most clubs. Midge gets a big break when famous singer Shy Baldwin hires her for his upcoming tour.

In the third season, Midge's career is on an upswing touring with Shy Baldwin. Balancing her comedy career and family life is difficult, however. Although Midge and Joel are divorcing, they remain in each other's lives, even as both navigate new romantic relationships. Midge is furious when Susie agrees to manage the eccentric and unpredictable Sophie Lennon, then realizes Susie needs multiple clients to financially survive. Joel forges a different path into the entertainment industry by opening a nightclub in Chinatown, later discovering his landlords run a gambling den downstairs. After carelessly alluding to Shy's homosexuality during her set at the Apollo Theater, Midge is fired from the Baldwin tour.

The fourth season finds Midge enraged and humiliated after being fired. She struggles to restart her career and vows to only do headliner gigs, not opening acts. Complicating matters, a Daily News reporter continually disparages Midge's performances in print. Meanwhile, a jealous Sophie Lennon again thwarts Midge's career. Joel's landlords are unhappy that his successful club draws attention to their illegal activities. Joel also copes with girlfriend Mei's unexpected pregnancy, his mother's meddling, and his father's heart attack. Midge becomes the comic emcee at a strip club, seemingly content to languish there until police raid the place. Lenny Bruce gets Midge out in time, then helps reboot her career.

Cast and characters

Main

 Rachel Brosnahan as Miriam "Midge" Maisel (née Weissman), a Jewish American housewife who discovers her flair for stand-up comedy after her husband leaves her. She finds a job as a make-up counter girl at B. Altman and starts performing stand-up comedy in clubs across New York.
 Alex Borstein as Susie Myerson, an employee of The Gaslight Cafe and Midge's manager.
 Michael Zegen as Joel Maisel, Midge's estranged husband, who leaves Midge for his secretary. He is an aspiring, though untalented, stand-up comic who copies Bob Newhart's routines. Joel quits his uncle's plastics company and ends up working at his father's garment factory. Lenny Palmieri portrays a thirteen-year-old Joel in a guest appearance in the episode "Put That On Your Plate!".
 Marin Hinkle as Rose Weissman (née Lehman), Midge's mother who later becomes a matchmaker.
 Tony Shalhoub as Abraham "Abe" Weissman, Midge's father, a mathematics professor at Columbia University and researcher at Bell Labs. He later begins a new career as the theater critic for The Village Voice.
 Kevin Pollak as Moishe Maisel (seasons 2–5, recurring season 1), Joel's father, the owner of Maisel and Roth Garment Company.
 Caroline Aaron as Shirley Maisel (seasons 3–5, recurring seasons 1–2), Joel's mother.
 Jane Lynch as Sophie Lennon (season 3, recurring seasons 2 and 4, guest season 1), a successful stand-up comic who uses a fat suit and shtick gimmicks to portray a frumpy, uncouth housewife from Queens in her act. In reality, she is a rich, snobbish Manhattan socialite with refined tastes.
 Luke Kirby as Lenny Bruce (season 4, recurring seasons 1–3 and 5), a well-known New York City comedian and close friend of Midge's.
 Reid Scott as Gordon Ford (season 5, recurring season 4), a talk show host.
 Jason Ralph as Mike Carr (season 5, recurring season 4), a booker on the Gordon Ford Show.
 Alfie Fuller as Dinah Rutledge (season 5, recurring season 4), Susie’s receptionist.

Recurring
Introduced in season 1

 Matilda Szydagis as Zelda, the Weissmans' maid.
 Nunzio and Matteo Pascale as Ethan Maisel, Midge and Joel's elder child.
 Brian Tarantina as Jackie, the emcee at The Gaslight. After Tarantina's death, his character dies offscreen of a stroke in season 4.
 Joel Johnstone as Archie Cleary, Imogene's husband and Joel's coworker.
 Bailey De Young as Imogene Cleary, Midge's best friend.
 Cynthia Darlow as Mrs. Moskowitz, Joel's secretary, former childhood nanny, and Penny's replacement.
 Holly Curran as Penny Pann, Joel's former secretary and girlfriend.
 Will Brill as Noah Weissman, Midge's brother. He is secretly an analyst for the CIA.
 Joanna Glushak as Mrs. O'Toole, the floor supervisor at B. Altman.
 Justine Lupe as Astrid, Noah's wife and Midge's sister-in-law. She is very insecure about the fact that she was not born Jewish.
 David Paymer as Harry Drake, a successful manager of comedians with clients including Sophie Lennon.
 David Aaron Baker as Charles Connelly, Abe's boss at Bell Labs.
 Max Casella as Michael Kessler, Midge's lawyer and a former activist acquaintance of Abe's.
 Steven Hauck as Dawes, Sophie Lennon’s acerbic butler

Introduced in season 2

 Zachary Levi as Dr. Benjamin Ettenberg, a doctor whom Midge meets in the Catskills and later begins to date.
 Erik Palladino as Frank, a low-level mob enforcer partnered with Nicky and later develops a friendship with Susie
 John Scurti as Nick, a low-level mob enforcer partnered with Frank and later develops a friendship with Susie
 Leroy McClain as Shy Baldwin, a singer who gives Midge her big break to be his opening act on tour.
 Emily Bergl as Tessie, Susie's sister.
 Colby Minifie as Ginger, a coworker of Midge's at B. Altman who works at the switchboard.
 Andrew Polk as Fred, an agent that Susie networks with for booking gigs with Midge.
 Connor Ratliff as Chester, a stalker of Susie who later becomes her roommate. 
 Teddy Coluca as Manny, a worker at Maisel & Roth.

Introduced in season 3
 Sterling K. Brown as Reggie, Shy Baldwin's manager.
 Stephanie Hsu as Mei Lin, a mysterious Chinese-American woman who has connections to an illegal gambling ring underneath Joel's new club.
 Liza Weil as Carole Keen, a bass player in Baldwin's orchestra who becomes a friendly mentor to Midge; she is very loosely modeled on renowned bassist Carol Kaye, though Kaye found the character an insulting representation.
 Cary Elwes as Gavin Hawk, Sophie Lennon's co-star in Miss Julie.
 Jason Alexander as Asher Friedman, Abe's old friend who is a playwright.
 Wanda Sykes as comedian Moms Mabley.

Introduced in season 4
 Kayli Carter as Gloria, a burlesque dancer at The Wolford
 Gideon Glick as Alfie, a magician who Susie manages
 Santino Fontana as Boise, the stage manager at a Manhattan burlesque club called The Wolford
 Hari Nef as L. Roy Dunham, a newspaper critic reviewing Midge’s acts
 Kelly Bishop as Benedetta, a leader of a matchmaking consortium based in NYC
 Jackie Hoffman as Gitta, a NYC matchmaker
 Patrice Johnson Chevannes as Miss Em, a NYC matchmaker
 Marceline Hugot as Molly, a NYC matchmaker

Episodes

Season 1 (2017)

Season 2 (2018)

Season 3 (2019)

Season 4 (2022)

Production

Development
In developing the series, Amy Sherman-Palladino was inspired by childhood memories of her father, a standup comedian based in NYC, and an admiration for early female comics such as Joan Rivers and Totie Fields.

In June 2016, Amazon gave the production a pilot order. The pilot episode was written by Sherman-Palladino, who was also executive producer. It premiered as a part of Amazon's Spring 2017 pilot season on March 17, 2017. On April 10, Amazon gave the production a two-season order, to be executive produced by Sherman-Palladino and Daniel Palladino with Dhana Gilbert as a producer. The series premiered on November 29, 2017.

On May 20, 2018, Amazon renewed the series for a third season of eight episodes. The second season premiered on December 5, 2018, and the third season premiered December 6, 2019. One week after season three was released, Amazon renewed the show for a fourth season.

On February 17, 2022, Amazon renewed the series for a fifth and final season, which consists of 9 episodes and is set to premiere on April 14, 2023.

Casting
On August 5, 2016, Rachel Brosnahan was cast in the pilot's lead role. In September 2016, it was reported that Tony Shalhoub and Michael Zegen had joined the pilot's main cast. On October 6, 2016, Marin Hinkle was cast in one of the pilot's main roles. In May 2017, it was reported that Joel Johnstone, Caroline Aaron, Kevin Pollak, and Bailey De Young were set to appear in recurring roles.

On May 23, 2018, Zachary Levi was announced to appear in the second season in a recurring capacity. On August 15, 2018, it was reported that Jane Lynch would reprise her role of Sophie Lennon in recurring capacity in season two.

On April 15, 2019, it was announced that Sterling K. Brown would appear in the third season in an undisclosed role. The October 14, 2019, release of the season's teaser trailer revealed that Liza Weil would also play an undisclosed character.

On June 21, 2021, Kayli Carter was announced to appear in the fourth season in a recurring capacity. Other season 4 guest stars include Milo Ventimiglia and Kelly Bishop, who both appeared on Gilmore Girls which was created by Amy Sherman-Palladino. Additional season 4 guest stars include Jason Ralph (who is Rachel Brosnahan's real-life husband) and filmmaker John Waters. For the fifth season, Reid Scott, Alfie Fuller, and Jason Ralph, were promoted to series regulars after having recurring roles in the fourth season.

Filming

Principal photography for the pilot took place from September 27 to October 14, 2016, in Manhattan. Filming for the fourth season began on January 20, 2021 and wrapped in early July 2021. Filming for the fifth season began in late February 2022 in New York City.

Locations 
Exterior shots for the Gaslight Club were filmed in October 2016 outside 96 St. Mark's Place in the Lower East Side, the building featured on the cover of Led Zeppelin's 1975 album Physical Graffiti. The building's residents were reportedly unhappy about the disruption that the production would cause.

Other New York locations included The Village Vanguard jazz club on Seventh Avenue South, a vintage record store on West 4th Street, and Albanese Meats & Poultry, a butcher shop on Elizabeth Street in Little Italy. Exterior scenes set at the B. Altman department store were filmed at the B. Altman and Company Building at Fifth Avenue, while interiors were shot in a disused bank in Brooklyn.

Season 2's scenes set at the holiday resort in the Catskills were filmed on location at a holiday resort on the Oquaga Lake near Deposit. Paris scenes were filmed at various real-life locations in the 2nd arrondissement of Paris, and at the Musée Rodin at Hôtel Biron. One of the hotels in season 3 was the Fontainebleau Miami Beach.

Oners 
The show makes frequent use of "oners," extended single-shot scenes. "Going to the Catskills" offers a two-minute oner depicting Midge and her family getting rambunctiously resettled in their summer home in the Catskills. It included a half-dozen overlapping vignettes. In "Strike Up the Band," in a 12-page scene, Midge comes into their apartment to find her parents fighting, with her clothes scattered everywhere. In another, Midge and Susie ride in an open Jeep to an airplane hangar where Midge will later open for Shy. The camera follows them from the Jeep into the hangar, where soldiers manhandle her onto the stage, which she crosses while waving to the nearly 1,000 soldiers facing her before she is lifted back into the Jeep.

Design
The "apartment" where Midge and her husband Joel live was created on the same set as the apartment where Midge's parents live, but with more modern (late-1950s) design, inspired in part by Doris Day movies, according to production designer Bill Groom. The "retro" typeface used for the show's logo is Sparkly by Stuart Sandler of Font Diner. The show's distinctive designs and costumes—most notably the women's hats and dresses—led the Paley Center for Media to create an exhibit called "Making Maisel Marvelous" in 2019.

The design of a Cuban dance number in episode 5 of season 3 was inspired by the film I Am Cuba, which is a favorite film of series cinematographer M. David Mullen.

In December 2019, two costumes from the series were acquired by the National Museum of American History at the Smithsonian Institution.

Release

Marketing

On October 10, 2017, the official trailer for the first season was released. On August 9, 2018, a teaser trailer for the second season was released. On October 24, 2018, the official trailer for season two was released. From December 1–8, 2018, Amazon opened up a pop-up restaurant in Manhattan's Nolita neighborhood modeled after Carnegie Deli as it appeared during the 1950s. The restaurant served a menu much more limited than what was actually offered at the original deli with the only two sandwich options being "The Maisel" and "The Susie." Other items offered included mini knishes, black and white cookies, cheesecake, and pickles. As the restaurant was purely for promotional purposes, nothing on the menu cost more than 99 cents, and all the proceeds went to support the Lower Eastside Girls Club.

In August 2019, to promote the show for the upcoming 71st Primetime Emmy Awards, Amazon partnered with various businesses in and around Santa Monica, California, to provide goods and services at 1959 prices. The offer to sell gasoline at $0.30 per gallon led to long queues and traffic jams in front of the gas station that offered the promotion, forcing police to intervene.

Premiere
The series held its official premiere on November 13, 2017, at the Village East Cinema in New York City.

Season 4's release format changes from the all-at-once binge of previous seasons to weekly releases of two episodes each.

Reception

The series has received broad critical acclaim. On Rotten Tomatoes, it received an overall score of 89% and an overall score of 78 on Metacritic.

Season 1 
On review aggregator Rotten Tomatoes, the first season holds a 94% approval rating, with an average rating of 7.6 out of 10 based on 82 reviews. The website's critical consensus reads, "The Marvelous Mrs. Maisel is an upbeat addition to Amazon's original offerings, propelled by a playful yet poignant performance by Rachel Brosnahan." On Metacritic, the series has an average weighted score of 80 out of 100, based on 27 critics, indicating "generally favorable reviews".

The pilot episode of The Marvelous Mrs. Maisel was one of Amazon Video's most successful ever, achieving an average viewer rating of 4.9 (out of 5). The review of the pilot in The Guardian praised the combination of Sherman-Palladino's "banging dialogue and the utterly winning charm of Brosnahan", while The A.V. Club praised the "outstanding" production design and said "this is a series that's as confident as its heroine—and what a heroine she is." A critic for Slate called the episode "a knockout", stating that the stand-up element "introduces a welcome streak of discipline, both verbal and thematic, into Sherman-Palladino's charming but manic work."

The Jerusalem Post highlighted the exceptionally well done "Jewishness" of the work, calling it a "comedic delight of a show, combining Sherman-Palladino's knack for witty dialogue with the colorful, rich world of 1950s New York and the intensity of family drama and changing times." NPR similarly highlighted the effectiveness of the comedy in the show, calling it "a heroic fantasy."

Season 2 
On Rotten Tomatoes, the second season holds a 92% approval rating, with an average rating of 8.2 out of 10 based on 72 reviews. The website's critical consensus reads, "Like Midge herself, The Marvelous Mrs. Maisel charges full speed ahead in a second season brimming with warmth, empowerment, and a whole lot of laughs." Metacritic assigned the season a score of 85 out of 100 based on 24 critics, indicating "universal acclaim". Karen Lehrman Bloch called it "a timeless, transcendent work of art".

Season 3 
On Rotten Tomatoes, the third season holds a 79% approval rating, with an average rating of 7.6 out of 10 based on 52 reviews. The website's critical consensus reads, "As visually spectacular as ever, The Marvelous Mrs. Maisels banter and pace still fly with comedic fury – but shallow social commentary and wandering storylines highlight the show's increasingly superficial tendencies." Metacritic assigned the season a score of 75 out of 100 based on 19 critics, indicating "generally favorable reviews". Alan Sepinwall of Rolling Stone wrote that it offered "a lot of energy and fancy footwork that often makes no sense".

Season 4 
On Rotten Tomatoes, the fourth season holds an 91% approval rating, with an average rating of 7.5 out of 10 based on 46 reviews. The website's critical consensus reads, "The Marvelous Mrs. Maisel has seemingly run out of fresh material, but it continues to reward fans with expert delivery and snappy presentation." Metacritic assigned the season a score of 65 out of 100 based on 17 critics, indicating "generally favorable reviews".

Awards and nominations

References

External links
 
 
 Official screenplay for "Everything is Bellmore"

2017 American television series debuts
2010s American comedy-drama television series
2020s American comedy-drama television series
Adultery in television
Amazon Prime Video original programming
English-language television shows
Jewish comedy and humor
Television series about Jews and Judaism
Television series created by Amy Sherman-Palladino
Television series by Amazon Studios
Television series about comedians
Television series set in the 1950s
Television series set in the 1960s
Television shows set in New York City
Cultural depictions of Lenny Bruce
Best Musical or Comedy Series Golden Globe winners
Primetime Emmy Award for Outstanding Comedy Series winners
Primetime Emmy Award-winning television series